The Nisean horse, or Nisaean horse, is an extinct horse breed, once native to the town of Nisaia, located in the Nisaean plains at the foot of the southern region of the Zagros Mountains, Iran.

History
The first written reference to the Nisean horse was in around 430 BCE, in Herodotus' Histories:
"In front of the king went first a thousand horsemen, picked men of the Persian nation then spearmen a thousand, likewise chosen troops, with their spearheads pointing towards the ground – next ten of the sacred horses called Nisaean, all daintily caparisoned. (Now these horses are called Nisaean, because they come from the Nisaean plain, a vast flat in Media, producing horses of unusual size.)"<ref>Herodotus, Histories', 7.40.2-3 </ref>They were highly sought after in the ancient world.  The Nisean horse was said to have come in several colors, including common colors such as dark bay, chestnut and seal brown, but also rarer colors such as black,  roan, palomino, and various spotted patterns. The ancient Nisean horse was said to have had "not the slender Arabian head of the Luristan Culture but a more robust one that was characteristic of the great warhorse".  This suggests the Nisean may have been a descendant of the "forest horse" prototype.

The Nisean, according to one source, was "tall and swift, and color adorned his sides. The Chinese called the breed the tien ma – heavenly horse or Soulon-vegetarian dragon. The Nisean was the most valuable horse in the ancient world. Some were spotted, like a leopard or, as golden as a newly minted coin. Others were red and blue roan with darker color.

The royal Nisean was the mount of the nobility in ancient Persia. Two gray Nisean stallions pulled the shah’s royal chariot, while four of the regal animals pulled the chariot of Ahura Mazda, the supreme god of Persia and Medea. Silver coins from the days of Cyrus the Great show him hunting lions from horseback using a spear. It is safe to assume that courage and manageability were more important than color on these occasions, and without the stirrup, Cyrus also needed a smooth riding horse, so it is assumed that the Nisean horse also had smooth gaits.

During the reign of Darius, Nisean horses were bred from Armenia to Sogdiana. The Nisean horse was so sought after, that the Greeks (mainly, the Spartans) imported Nisean horses and bred them to their native stock, and many nomadic tribes, (such as the Scythians) in and around the Persian Empire also imported, captured, or stole Nisean horses.

Nisean horses had several traits that they passed on to their descendants. One of them was bony knobs on their forehead often referred to as "horns".  This could have been due to prominent temple bones or cartilage on their forehead.The Greeks exported many horses to the Iberian peninsula, where the Nisean greatly influenced the ancestors of today's Iberian horse breeds, such as the Carthusian, Lusitano, Andalusian, Barb, and Spanish Mustang.

The Nisean horse was first mentioned in great detail by A.T. Olmstead, in his History of the Persian Empire. Pure white Niseans were the horses of kings and, in myth, gods. Cyrus the Great was so distraught, when one of his stallions was drowned while crossing a river, he had the river where the horse was drowned drained. He did not believe that anything could kill a horse so beautiful.

Olmstead also wrote that the Assyrians started their spring campaigns, by attacking the Medes for their horses. The Medes were the breeders of the first Nisean horses.

The Romans had their first encounter with the Nisean and the Parthian cataphract at the Battle of Carrhae (53 BC) when General Crassus went up against the great Parthian General Surena. After Crassus fell to the Parthians, his head and standards were presented to Orodes II. In 36 BC, Mark Antony avenged Crassus's death by ravaging the region of Media Atropatene with 16 legions. At his disposal were 100,000 infantry and 10,000 cavalry, drawn from as far away as Gaul and Spain. Of these, 30,000 were Roman Legionnaires. When the Parthians would not give him the battle he wanted, he ravaged Armenia, and brought back the Armenian King Artavasdes to Egypt. Among the prized possessions taken were the first Nisean horses in Rome. When Antony died, these horses fell into the hands of Augustus. According to Michael Decker in the Oxford Dictionary of Late Antiquity, Nisaean horses were the most famous Iranian breed.

Elwyn Hartley Edwards also added it is possible that the Arabs also had influence in the breeding of legendary Nisean horses, since geographically the breed theoretically was bred in western Iran of Medes. Edwards further remarked the possibility that the Nisean were also infused with Arabian horse breed.

Historical events
Following their assassination of Bardiya in 522 BCE, the conspirators led by Otanes and Darius the Great agreed that whoever's horse neighed at the moment of sunrise would be rewarded with the kingship of Persia. According to legend, Darius' Nisean horse neighed first.
In 481 BCE, Xerxes invaded Thessaly and raced his Nisean mares against the legendary Thessalian mares and beat them.
In 479 BCE, General Mardonius was killed beneath his gray Nisean stallion at the Battle of Plataea.  The stallion was so feared for its training that the Athenians had actually devised a plan to kill the horse.
When Alexander the Great conquered Persia, he demanded a tribute of thousands of Nisean horses from the captured cities. 
When the Roman writer Strabo saw the Nisean horses, he said that they were the most elegant riding horses alive.
The elite Sasanian cavalry unit Zhayedan are thought to have used the Nisean horses.
St. Isidore of Seville stated that the Roman horses of the imperial stud, founded by Justinian I in Constantinople, were the most beautiful horses in the world.
Emperor Wu Ti was told about the Heavenly Horses to the West and sent an army to get some for China; thirteen Heavenly Horses were taken from Ferghana along with a thousand lesser animals. When the Emperor saw the horses, he decided that the expedition was worth it.
The Nisean became extinct with the conquest of Constantinople in 1204. 
Elwyn Hartley Edwards in The New Encyclopedia of the Horse'' called the Nisean the "super horse of the ancient world".

References

Burris-Davis, Beverley. Parthian Horses, Parthian Archers. bibliography attached. 
Davis, Beverley. Timeline for the Development of the Horse. Sino-platonic papers. 
Olmstead, A. T. History of the Persian Empire. University of Chicago Press. 1948
Plutarch. The Lives of Noble Greeks and Romans

Further reading
 
 

Extinct horse breeds
Horse breeds originating in Iran
Horse breeds